Ilaha Kadimova (born November 5, 1975) is an Azerbaijani Woman Grandmaster chess player.

She won the World Youth Chess Championship (Girls) in 1992, 1993 and  European Junior Chess Championship (Girls) in 1993.

References

External links

Azerbaijani female chess players
Chess woman grandmasters
Living people
1975 births
Sportspeople from Ganja, Azerbaijan
World Youth Chess Champions